Hyalurga grandis is a moth of the family Erebidae. It was described by Herbert Druce in 1911. It is found in Peru.

References

 

Hyalurga
Moths described in 1911